Dead Set is the seventh live album (eighteenth overall) by the Grateful Dead. It was released in August 1981 on Arista.

The album contains live material recorded between September and October 1980 at the Warfield Theatre in San Francisco and Radio City Music Hall in New York. Original CD pressings omitted the track "Space" so the entire album could fit on one CD. However, "Space" was included when the album was later rereleased as part of the 2004 Beyond Description box set, as well as on one CD in 2006.  The 2006 release also included a bonus CD of live material.

Dead Set is essentially a companion release to Reckoning, a 1981 release of songs featuring acoustic instruments: both of the albums were recorded at the same runs of concerts. Due to the length of the Dead's songs, several tracks from Dead Set were edited for release on vinyl, and the edited versions have been retained on CD reissues.

The album's cover features an Uncle Sam skeleton perched on the Marin Headlands looking at the view of San Francisco, with a striking twilight sky reflecting off the bay. The back cover of the original gatefold album continues this image, except that it shows a view of Manhattan and Brooklyn.

Track listing

Personnel
Grateful Dead
 Jerry Garcia – guitar, vocals
 Mickey Hart – drums
 Bill Kreutzmann – drums
 Phil Lesh – bass guitar
 Brent Mydland – keyboards, vocals
 Bob Weir – guitar, vocals

Production
 Dan Healy – producer
 Jerry Garcia – producer
 Betty Cantor-Jackson – producer
 Joe Gastwirt – digital remastering
 Don Pearson – engineering
 John Cutler – engineering
 Dennis Leonard – engineering
 Dennis Larkins – cover illustration
 John Werner – centerfold photography
 Jim Welch – album jacket production

Recording dates
Dead Set was recorded during the same shows as Reckoning.

 October 3, 1980 Warfield Theatre: "Brokedown Palace"
 October 4, 1980 Warfield Theatre: "Deal", "Feel Like a Stranger", and "Not Fade Away"
 October 7, 1980 Warfield Theatre: "Shakedown Street"
 October 9, 1980 Warfield Theatre: "Greatest Story Ever Told"
 October 10, 1980 Warfield Theatre: "Samson and Delilah", "New Minglewood Blues", "Row Jimmy", and "Jack Straw"
 October 11, 1980 Warfield Theatre: "Loser" and "Passenger"
 October 13, 1980 Warfield Theatre: "C.C. Rider", "Lazy Lightnin', and "Supplication"
 October 25, 1980 Radio City Music Hall: "Franklin's Tower" and "High Time"
 October 26, 1980 Radio City Music Hall: "Let It Grow" and "Sugaree"
 October 27, 1980 Radio City Music Hall: "Friend of the Devil"
 October 29, 1980 Radio City Music Hall: "Candyman" and "Little Red Rooster"
 October 31, 1980 Radio City Music Hall: "Rhythm Devils", "Space", and "Fire on the Mountain"

Charts
Album—Billboard

Notes

External links
 Dead.net, the official homepage of the Grateful Dead.

1981 live albums
Albums produced by Dan Healy (soundman)
Albums produced by Jerry Garcia
Albums recorded at Radio City Music Hall
Arista Records live albums
Grateful Dead live albums
Rhino Records live albums